Campylotropsis is a plant genus consisting of a number of species of perennials native to Nepal, China, Korea and Taiwan.

Species
Campylotropsi chinensis
Campylotropis diversifolia
Campylotropis drummondii
Campylotropis eriocarpa 
Campylotropis esquirolii
Campylotropis gracilis
Campylotropis hersii
Campylotropis latifolia
Campylotropis meebildii
Campylotropis muehleana
Campylotropis parviflora
Campylotropis polyantha
Campylotropis prainii 
Campylotropis sargentiana
Campylotropis stenocarpa
Campylotropis trigonoclada
Campylotropis wilsonii
Campylotropis yunnanensis

References
Botanica Sistematica

Faboideae
Fabaceae genera